The 2008 10,000 Lakes Festival was held July 23 through July 26.

2008 Lineup

Phil Lesh and Friends
The Flaming Lips
Michael Franti and Spearhead
Mickey Hart Band featuring Steve Kimock and George Porter Jr.
Leftover Salmon
George Clinton and the Parliament-Funkadelic
Medeski Martin & Wood with special guest John Scofield
Slightly Stoopid
Dark Star Orchestra
WookieFoot
TR3 featuring Tim Reynolds
The Bad Plus
JJ Grey & MOFRO
Deep Banana Blackout
Lotus
Teddy Presberg
Bonerama
Papa Mali
Extra Golden
EOTO
Panjea with Michael Kang
The Waybacks
Everyone Orchestra
Secret Chiefs 3
The New Mastersounds
The Wood Brothers
Dub Trio
Cornmeal
Kelly Richey Band
Family Groove Company
U-Melt
One Under
God Johnson
Phix
Kinetix
New Primitives
White Iron Band
Moon Taxi
Lynx
Redux
WBPN
Pert Near Sandstone
Heatbox
Ultraviolet Hippopotamus
The Hue
GypsyFoot
Gold Standard
Enchanted Ape
The Limns
Rhinestone Diplomats
The Histronic
Solution
Sovereign Sect
Blue Martian Tribe
Dead Larry
Roster McCabe
Comosapiens
Bill Smith
The Twin Cats
Dred I Dread
Jpetty (All Good Things)
The Stretch
Springdale Quartet

10,000 Lakes Festival
2008 in American music
2008 music festivals
10000